The following is a list of current National Football Conference (NFC) team rosters:

NFC East

Dallas Cowboys

New York Giants

Philadelphia Eagles

Washington Commanders

NFC North

Chicago Bears

Detroit Lions

Green Bay Packers

Minnesota Vikings

NFC South

Atlanta Falcons

Carolina Panthers

New Orleans Saints

Tampa Bay Buccaneers

NFC West

Arizona Cardinals

Los Angeles Rams

San Francisco 49ers

Seattle Seahawks

See also
List of current AFC team rosters

NFC